Rushi Sharma is an Indian costume designer, who works jointly with Manoshi Nath in Bollywood films. Their team has earned Filmfare Award for Best Costume Design two times : 2009 and 2013.

Career
Rusha is a Marwari (Hindi-speaking people). She met Manoshi in 1998. She made friendship with her instantly. Later, she studied Fashion Designing from BIFT, a leading fashion institute of India. She and Manoshi together set up their company "Fools’ Paradise" in 2007. The next year, they collaborated on Dibakar Banerjee’s Khosla Ka Ghosla. They had designed for Oye Lucky! Lucky Oye! the same year. It became a box-office disaster, but the duo went on to win Filmfare Award for Best Costume Design for their amazing work. There was no looking back for the team since then. She and her partner Manoshi later designed for films like Once Upon a Time in Mumbaai (2010), Shanghai (2012), Talaash (2012) and Queen (2014), PK (2014), Detective Byomkesh Bakshi (2016). PK became highest grossing Bollywood film of all time with nearly 754 crore INR until 2017. The team's design of Aamir Khan, Sanjay Dutt and Anushka Sharma nationwide applause and recognition. Sanjay Dutt wore an Angarkha in typical Rajasthani prints, the Rajasthani Pagdi and Aviators. She and Manoshi bought shirts and pantsand went to small towns like Mandawa (Rajasthan). In 2015, they received Bollywood Style Award for Best Costume Design for their design provided for Kangana Ranaut who played a Royal Indian Queen/Rani. They bought textiles from tiny gullies of Chandni Chowk, denim fabric from the popular Mohan Singh Palace, Delhi and footwear from the illustrious Balli-Maran,  Delhi. In 2016, she and Manoshi were scheduled to design dresses for Dangal, the highest grossing Indian film of all time. But, co-producer Aamir Khan replaced them with Maxima Basu, the assistant director of Oscar-winning film Slumdog Millionaire, he cited the reason as they charged very high amount of money compared to the film's budget.

Awards

References

External links
 

Fashion stylists
Indian costume designers
Filmfare Awards winners
Living people
Year of birth missing (living people)